The men's decathlon at the 2013 Southeast Asian Games, the athletics was held in Naypyidaw, Myanmar. The track and field events took place at the Wunna Theikdi Stadiumon December 17–18 .

Schedule
All times are Myanmar Standard Time (UTC+06:30)

Records

Results 
Legend
– — Pass
O — Clearance
X — Failure
DNF — Did not finish
DNS — Did not start

100 metres 
 Wind :  -0.6 m/s

Long jump

Shot put

High jump

400 metres

110 metres hurdles
 Wind : -0.3 m/s

Discus throw

Pole vault

Javelin throw

1500 metres

Summary

References

Athletics at the 2013 Southeast Asian Games